Fleissig is a surname. Notable people with the surname include:

 Audrey G. Fleissig (born 1955), United States district judge
 Bernhard Fleissig (1853–1951), Hungarian-born Austrian chess master
 Max Fleissig (1845–1919), Hungarian-born Austrian chess master

Jewish surnames